Teona Akubardia (born 9 October 1978 in Tbilisi) is a Georgian politician. Since 2020, she is member of Parliament of Georgia by party list, from bloc "Giorgi Vashadze – Strategy Aghmashenebeli". 

She has boycotted parliament (with her party and opposition) due to alleged election fraud.

From 2014 to 2018, Akubardia served as the deputy secretary of Georgia’s National Security Council. She is a co-founder of Georgian Strategic Analysis Center.

References

External links
 Teona Akubardia, Parliament of Georgia

1978 births
Living people
Members of the Parliament of Georgia
21st-century politicians from Georgia (country)